Hebron "Loni" Fangupo (born July 19, 1985) is an American football nose tackle who is currently a free agent. He signed with the Houston Texans after going unselected in the 2012 NFL Draft. He played college football at Brigham Young University after he served a two-year Mormon mission in Philippines. Prior to BYU, he attended Mt. San Antonio College and Southern California.

He has been a member of the Kansas City Chiefs, Houston Texans, Seattle Seahawks, Pittsburgh Steelers, and Washington Redskins.

Professional career

Seattle Seahawks
Fangupo was signed to the Seattle Seahawks practice squad on September 12, 2012 after spending training camp with the Houston Texans. Fangupo was signed to the active roster on December 20, 2012 before being cut.
On December 29, 2012, he was signed to the Pittsburgh Steelers in time for their final game of the season against the Cleveland Browns.

First stint with the Kansas City Chiefs
Fangupo was signed to the Kansas City Chiefs practice squad on September 1, 2014.

Washington Redskins
Fangupo was signed to the practice squad of the Washington Redskins on September 16, 2014. He was released by the team on September 30, 2014.

Second stint with the Kansas City Chiefs
Fangupo was signed to the Kansas City Chiefs practice squad on November 5, 2014. On December 31, he signed a futures contract with the Chiefs. On May 15, 2015, Fangupo was waived by the Chiefs. On August 1, 2015, he was re-signed by the Chiefs. On September 5, 2015, Fangupo was waived by the Chiefs and was re-signed to the practice squad. On November 17, 2015, Fangupo was released from the practice squad.

Coaching career
In 2017, Fangupo he became the defensive line coach at Snow College in Ephraim, Utah. In 2019, he moved to Utah Tech University (formerly Dixie State University) in the same position.

References

External links
 BYU Cougars bio
 Seattle Seahawks bio
 Kansas City Chiefs bio
 Twitter

American football defensive tackles
American people of Tongan descent
BYU Cougars football players
1985 births
Living people
Latter Day Saints from California
Houston Texans players
Seattle Seahawks players
Pittsburgh Steelers players
Kansas City Chiefs players
Washington Redskins players
Sportspeople from Santa Ana, California
Players of American football from California
American Mormon missionaries in the Philippines
21st-century Mormon missionaries
Coaches of American football from California
Snow Badgers football coaches
Utah Tech Trailblazers football coaches